The 2021–22 Southeast Missouri State Redhawks men's basketball team represented Southeast Missouri State University in the 2021–22 NCAA Division I men's basketball season. The Redhawks, led by second-year head coach Brad Korn, played their home games at the Show Me Center in Cape Girardeau, Missouri as members of the Ohio Valley Conference.

Previous season
In a season limited due to the ongoing COVID-19 pandemic, the Redhawks finished the 2020–21 season 11–16, 9–11 in OVC play to finish in seventh place. They lost to Morehead State in the quarterfinals of the OVC tournament.

Roster

Schedule and results

|-
!colspan=12 style=| Non-conference regular season

|-
!colspan=12 style=| Ohio Valley regular season

|-
!colspan=9 style=| Ohio Valley tournament

Source

References

Southeast Missouri State Redhawks men's basketball seasons
Southeast Missouri State Redhawks
Southeast Missouri State Redhawks men's basketball
Southeast Missouri State Redhawks men's basketball